Jet-Ace Logan was a British comic strip that appeared in The Comet (1956–1959) and Tiger (1959–1968), Thriller Picture Library, and the 1969 and 1972 Tiger Annuals.

Publication history 
Mike Butterworth created Jet-Ace Logan. He scripted the first adventure, which was drawn by Geoff Campion, and published in The Comet.  All subsequent adventures (approximately 20 in all) appearing in The Comet were scripted by David Motton, and drawn by John Gillat. Motton also scripted Jet-Ace Logan stories for Thriller Picture Library — namely "Times Five", "Seven Went To Sirius," and "Ten Days To Doom."

Other writers contributing scripts included David Motton, Kenneth Bulmer, and Frank S. Pepper; other artists illustrated the character's adventures, including Brian Lewis, Ron Turner, Francisco Solano López, and Kurt Caesar.

Fictional character biography 
The hero, Jim "Jet-Ace" Logan, was an ace interplanetary pilot of the RAF; stories were set about 100 years in the future (for example, the story in the 1963 Tiger Annual is set in 2063). In all but the earliest stories, his regular copilot, Plum-Duff (sometimes Plumduff) Charteris, accompanied Jet-Ace.

Many of the insightful scenarios, written in the 1950s, seem applicable more than a half a century later. For example, in one adventure, Jet-Ace was involved in fighting a group of aliens who endeavored to destroy humankind by contaminating the planet's atmosphere.

In later stories, Jet-Ace and Plumduff belonged to various law enforcement agencies, such as the Solar Police rather than military organizations.

In popular culture 
The Finnish cartoonist Petri Hiltunen created a spoof of Jet-Ace, named Rocket Reynolds, under a pseudonym, "Valentin Kalpa".

References

Sources
 Tiger Annual, 1963.
 Tiger Annual, 1968.
 Tiger Annual, 1969.

British comic strips
Fleetway and IPC Comics
Logan, Jet-Ace
Aviation comics
Logan, Jet-Ace
1956 comics debuts
Logan, Jet-Ace
1968 comics endings
Comics set in the 21st century
Science fiction comics